Earl Ziebarth (born December, 1963) in DeLand, Florida.

Ziebarth previously served as a Representative in the House of Representatives of the U.S. state of Florida. Ziebarth was elected to represent the 26th District in 1994. He currently lives in Gainesville, Florida with his children.

Early years
Earl Ziebarth was born to Betty Ann Pappas and Earl W. Ziebarth, JR on December 13, 1963, in DeLand, Florida.  Earl was raised in Pierson, Florida a small rural town in Volusia County.  This Central Florida community had around 1,000 residents and is known as the Fern Capital of the World for the cut foliage used in Floral arrangements.

Education
Ziebarth received his bachelor's degree in food and resource economics from the College of Agriculture at the University of Florida in 1986.

Ziebarth received his Associate of Arts degree from the University of Florida in 1985.

Ziebarth received his high school diploma from T. Dewitt Taylor High School in Pierson, Florida, in 1981.

University of Florida
Outstanding Male Graduate Award 1986

President of the student body 1985–1986, Elected by the student body in March 1985 as a junior. History

President of the Florida Student Association 1985, Elected by the 10 student body presidents of Florida's public universities.

Chief justice of the Student Traffic Court 1984–1985 Elected by the student body in March 1984 as a sophomore.

Deputy chief justice of the Student Traffic Court 1983–1984, appointed by Chief Justice Ava Parker, approved by student senate.

External links
Official Website of Earl Ziebarth

University of Florida alumni
1963 births
Republican Party members of the Florida House of Representatives
Living people
People from DeLand, Florida